Angèle is a 1934 French drama film directed, produced and written by Marcel Pagnol, based on the 1929 novel Un de Baumugnes by Jean Giono. It stars Orane Demazis.

Plot
A naive young woman, Angèle, leaves the farm where she has been raised after being seduced by a shrewd man who turns out to be a pimp. An honest handsome farm employee, Albin, tries to prevent her from going, but without success since she is mesmerized by Louis, the manipulating pimp.

She becomes a street prostitute in Marseille and leads a sad life. To make things worse, she has a child. A kind friend of hers, the childish and apparently a little mentally under-developed Saturnin, finds her thanks to some unexpected information. He brings her back home to her kind mother but the woman's father, Clarius, is so ashamed of what happened that he locks her in a cellar and hides her. He threatens anybody who shows up with his rifle. Albin, still in love with Angèle, and hoping she will return one day, works in the vicinity of the farm with Amédée, an older kind and helpful friend.

After some difficulties, Amédée manages to get employed at Clarius's farm, being supported by Angèle's mother, and above all because Clarius cannot work due to a bad arm needing a long rest and care. At first, Amédée believes Angèle is still away and has to disappoint Albin by telling him so. But on a stormy rainy night, the cellar being in danger of becoming flooded, Amédée sees her as she gets out of the cellar. He  tells Albin, who cleverly frees the girl and is accepted when he asks for her hand. Albin goes back to Clarius's farm to talk to him and ask for the girl's hand in the traditional way. Clarius, impressed by Albin, finally gives in and invites his daughter to sit on her usual chair at the kitchen table, which symbolizes that everything is finally forgiven.

Cast
Orane Demazis as Angèle Barbaroux
Fernandel as Saturnin
Henri Poupon as Clarius Barbaroux
Jean Servais as Albin
Annie Toinon as Philomène Barbaroux
Blanche Poupon as Florence
Marcelle Vial as the little maid
Thommeray as the monsieur in town
Andrex as Louis
Charles Blavette as Tonin (as Blavette)
Juliette Petit as L'Esmenarde
Fernand Flament as Jo (as Flament)
Darcelys as the tattowed man
Delaurme as the bar owner
Édouard Delmont as Amédée (as E. Delmont)

References

Further reading
Un de Baumugnes author Jean Giono, Published January 1, 1967, by Livre de Poche (originally published in 1957)

External links

Un de Baumugnes

1934 drama films
1934 films
French drama films
French black-and-white films
Films about prostitution in France
Films based on French novels
Films based on works by Jean Giono
Films directed by Marcel Pagnol
1930s French films